This article is about the particular significance of the year 1857 to Wales and its people.

Incumbents

Lord Lieutenant of Anglesey – Henry Paget, 2nd Marquess of Anglesey 
Lord Lieutenant of Brecknockshire – John Lloyd Vaughan Watkins
Lord Lieutenant of Caernarvonshire – Sir Richard Williams-Bulkeley, 10th Baronet 
Lord Lieutenant of Cardiganshire – Thomas Lloyd, Coedmore (until 12 July); Edward Pryse (from 14 September)
Lord Lieutenant of Carmarthenshire – John Campbell, 1st Earl Cawdor 
Lord Lieutenant of Denbighshire – Robert Myddelton Biddulph   
Lord Lieutenant of Flintshire – Sir Stephen Glynne, 9th Baronet
Lord Lieutenant of Glamorgan – Christopher Rice Mansel Talbot
Lord Lieutenant of Merionethshire – Robert Davies Pryce 
Lord Lieutenant of Monmouthshire – Capel Hanbury Leigh
Lord Lieutenant of Montgomeryshire – Charles Hanbury-Tracy, 1st Baron Sudeley
Lord Lieutenant of Pembrokeshire – Sir John Owen, 1st Baronet
Lord Lieutenant of Radnorshire – John Walsh, 1st Baron Ormathwaite

Bishop of Bangor – Christopher Bethell 
Bishop of Llandaff – Alfred Ollivant 
Bishop of St Asaph – Thomas Vowler Short 
Bishop of St Davids – Connop Thirlwall

Events

4 March — Thomas Gee launches the radical nonconformist newspaper Baner Cymru in Denbigh.
24 March — 1857 United Kingdom general election, concludes. Anglesey antiquarian William Owen Stanley becomes Whig MP for the Beaumaris District of Boroughs.
6 May — Samuel Roberts (S. R.) sails for Tennessee.
1 June — Opening of the Crumlin Viaduct, built to carry the Taff Vale Extension of the Newport, Abergavenny and Hereford Railway.
10 August — John Bowen is consecrated as Bishop of Sierra Leone.
13 August — Eugene Goddard crosses the Menai Strait in his gas balloon Aurora from Caernarfon Castle to Llanidan. 
3 October — The Newport Gazette is founded by William Nicholas Johns.
14 October — Four people are killed in a railway accident near Pyle.
29 October — St Deiniol's Church, Hawarden, badly damaged by arson.
Autumn — Aberdare Strike 1857-8 against reductions in coal miners' pay begins.
Railway workers go on strike at Aberdare.

Arts and literature

New books

English language
Richard Williams Morgan — The British Kymry or Britons of Cambria

Welsh language
Owen Wynne Jones — Dafydd Llwyd
Robert Parry (Robyn Ddu Eryri) — Teithiau a Barddoniaeth Robyn Ddu Eryri

Music
John Ashton — "Trefeglwys" (hymn tune)

Births
2 February - Sir James Cory, 1st Baronet, politician and ship-owner (died 1933)
7 February — Windham Henry Wyndham-Quin, 5th Earl Dunraven (died 1952)
28 February — Charlie Newman, Wales rugby union captain (died 1922)
27 April — Alfred Cattell, Wales international rugby player (died 1933)
12 May — Sarah Jacob, the "fasting girl" (died 1869)
20 June — Dan Griffiths, Wales international rugby player (died 1936)
28 June — Sir Robert Jones, 1st Baronet, orthopaedic surgeon (died 1933)
1 July — Martha Hughes Cannon, women's rights activist and politician in the United States (died 1932)
19 September — James Bridie, Scottish-born Wales international rugby union player (died 1893 in England)
8 November — Frank Purdon, Wales rugby union international
14 November — John Thomas Rees, musician (died 1949)
2 December — Sir Robert Armstrong-Jones, surgeon (died 1943)
Llewellyn Cadwaladr, operatic tenor (died 1909)

Deaths
3 January — Richard Philipps, 1st Baron Milford (second creation), 55
23 January — Edward Anwyl, Wesleyan minister and teacher, 70
10 February — David Thompson, explorer of Welsh parentage, 86
29 March — Elijah Waring, writer, ±69
16 May — Sir William Lloyd, soldier and mountaineer, 74
13 June — Daniel Rees, hymn-writer, 64
12 July — Thomas Lloyd, Coedmore, Lord Lieutenant of Cardiganshire, 64
12 August — William Daniel Conybeare, dean of Llandaff, 70
16 August — John Jones, Talysarn, leading non-conformist minister, 61

References

Wales